Aleksandra Čamagić (born 1985) is a politician and administrator in Serbia. She briefly served in the National Assembly of Serbia in 2020 as a member of the Serbian Patriotic Alliance (Srpski patriotski savez, SPAS) and is now an assistant minister in the country's ministry of family welfare and demography.

Early life and career
Čamagić was born in Belgrade, in what was then the Socialist Republic of Serbia in the Socialist Federal Republic Yugoslavia. She is a graduate of the University of Belgrade's Faculty of Philology and is a professor of English language and literature. She served as director of the New Belgrade Cultural Network until her resignation on 28 December 2020.

Politician

Municipal politics
Čamagić sought election to the New Belgrade municipal assembly in the 2016 Serbian local elections, appearing in the forty-fourth position on an independent electoral list led by incumbent mayor Aleksandar Šapić. This was too low a position for election to be a realistic prospect, and she was not elected even as the list won a narrow plurality victory with twenty-one seats.

Šapić's political movement was registered as the Serbian Patriotic Alliance in 2018. Čamagić was promoted to the twenty-second position on the party's list in the 2020 local elections and was this time elected when the list won twenty-three mandates. In August 2021, she was appointed to the municipality's commission for gender equality.

Čamagić served on the presidency of the SPAS. In 2021, the party was merged into the Serbian Progressive Party (Srpska napredna stranka, SNS).

Parliamentarian
Čamagić received the seventh position on the SPAS electoral list in the 2020 Serbian parliamentary election (which occurred concurrently with the local elections) and was elected when the list won eleven seats. Her term in the assembly was brief; she resigned on 19 November 2020.

Assistant minister
Čamagić now serves as an assistant minister in Serbia's ministry of family welfare and demography. In July 2021, she announced that Serbia was introducing more demanding training for foster parents and adoptive parents.

References

1985 births
Living people
Politicians from Belgrade
Members of the National Assembly (Serbia)
Serbian Patriotic Alliance politicians
Serbian Progressive Party politicians